The Wadjiginy, also referred to historically as the Wogait, are an indigenous Australian people of the Northern Territory, specifically from just north of modern-day Darwin. The Wadjiginy are a saltwater people who describe themselves as  'beach-dwellers' from the Batjamalh word  'beach'.

Name
The standard early ethnographic literature referred to the Wadjiginy with numerous variations of the word Wogait, a term taken to mean 'sea folk' by early investigators but which actually covers several tribes such as the Emmiyangal which later research has shown to be imprecise. The modern descriptor used among the tribe is Wadyiginy.

Country
Their inland extension is estimated at around 20 miles from the coast.

Alternative names
 Ami
 Amijangal
 Murinwargad (Murinbata term)
 Wagaidj, Wagite, Waggait, Waggite
 Wagatsch, Wa(o)gatsch
 Waggote, Waggute
 Wargad (Murinbata exonym)
 Wogite
 Worgait, Worgite, Worgaid, Wagait

Notes

Citations

Sources

Aboriginal peoples of the Northern Territory